Wayne Maxwell (born 18 October 1982) is a professional motorcycle racer from Australia. He was the Australian Superbike champion in 2013 and 2020 and the Australasian Superbike and Australian FX Superbike champion in 2014. He races in the Australasian Superbike Championship aboard a Yamaha YZF-R1.

Career statistics

Grand Prix motorcycle racing

By season

Races by year

Superbike World Championship

Races by year

References

External links

 

Australian motorcycle racers
Living people
1982 births
Moto2 World Championship riders
Superbike World Championship riders